The National Association of Women Business Owners (NAWBO) is an organization in the United States founded in 1975 that has the purpose of networking the approximately 10.6 million women-owned businesses so as to provide mutual support, share resources, and provide a single voice to help shape economic and public policy. As of 2007 the president of the organization is Lisa Kaiser Hickey of Lakeland, Florida.

History
According to its official timeline, NAWBO was founded in 1975 by a group of like-minded businesswomen in the Washington D.C. area. It is incorporated as the Association of Women Business Owners (AWBO) before evolving to its current name.

In 1982 NAWBO holds its first conference in Houston, Texas. Its first National Public Affairs Day saw the attendance of then US Vice President George H. W. Bush and nine members of the U.S. Congress. Eight years later it moved its headquarters from Chicago to Silver Spring, Maryland.

NAWBO has chapters in all the 50 states including several chapters in a single state such as Illinois and California.

Remarkable Woman Award 
NAWBO presents the annual Remarkable Woman Award. The first award was given out in 1996 to women who contribute time and talent to their organization and community.

Members

Charlotte chapter
 President: Marise Kumar, C2B Strategies
 Brenda Harris, BPN Healthcare Concepts
 Carolina Aponte, Caja Holdings LLC
 Vilma Betancourt-O'Day, 
 Carol Bondy, Center for the Healing Arts, LLC
 Lauren Cantor, The Entrepreneuers Source
 Mindy Hinson, M3 Real Estate Group
 Laurie Johnson, Financial Therapist
 Suzy Johnson, Employer Benefit Advisors of the Carolinas, LLC
 Melinda McVadon, McLynn Group
 Donna North, McLynn Group
 Elaine Piraneo, Accubill/Tele-Vantage Inc
 Stacey Randall, Growth By Referrals
 Pam Secrest, Pentagon Group
 Michelle Smith, MBS Custom Business Solutions, LLC

New Orleans chapter
 President: Shelly Grimm-Latino, LUTCF - Pinnacle Financial Strategies
 Tonia D. Aiken - Breezzangel, LLC
 Jennifer F. Brimm - Foster-Brimm Consulting
 Miriam Browns - Browns Tax Services, Inc.
 Georgia Collier-Bolling
 Deanna Causey - Sankofa Record Retrieval, LLC
 Elizabeth "Dee" Clubb - Omni Advertising
 McKenzie Coco - FSC Interactive
 Myra L. Corrello - Find Your Spice Seminars, LLC
 Sheila M. Craft - OfficeLink LC and FileLink
 Nicole Dennis - XOCOMP, LLC
 Patricia R Hightower CEO - Bayouequity Mortgage
 Terri Hogan Dreyer - Nano, LLC
 Robin G. Kaplan - Inn The Quarter, LLC
 Teresa Lawrence - Delta Personnel, Inc.
 Barbara Ann Locklear - Hotel Storyville
 Ashley Machen - Treasure Travel, LLC
 Martha Madden - M Madden Associates, LLC
 Tina Dandry-Mayes, CLU, ChFC, CLTC - NYLIFE Securities, LLC/ New York
 Cheryl Meral - MCS Software, LLC
 Brenda Prudhomme - K-Paul's Louisiana Kitchen
 Jessica Rareshide CPC CSP - Rare insight, LLC
 Gina N. Ruttley -Ericksen, Krentel, &LaPorte, LLC
 Jeffrie Schultis Fricke - Paramount Shows
 Janet Fabre Smith - Fabre Smith & Co.
 Dorothy L Tarver - Taggart Morton, LLC
 Judy Weitz - Compucast Web, Inc,
 Melissa Mitchel Willis - Mary Kay Cosmetics
 Trevor Wisdom - Wisdom & Witticisms, LLC

New York City chapter
 Sophie Wade

See also 

 List of awards honoring women

References

External links
 

Professional associations based in the United States
Women's political advocacy groups in the United States
Business organizations based in the United States
Organizations established in 1975